The Makira woodhen (Gallinula silvestris), also known as the Makira moorhen, is a species of bird in the family Rallidae.  It is endemic to the Solomon Islands.  Its natural habitats are subtropical or tropical moist lowland forest and subtropical or tropical moist montane forest.
It is critically endangered and sometimes considered extinct from habitat loss and predation by feral cats. The last recorded sighting was in 1953.

References

External links
BirdLife Species Factsheet.

Makira woodhen
Birds of Makira
Makira woodhen
Taxonomy articles created by Polbot
Taxobox binomials not recognized by IUCN